Alex Guerrero (born February 16, 1984) is a former American football offensive and defensive lineman. He was signed by the Kansas City Chiefs as an undrafted free agent in 2006. He played college football at Boise State.  He played the 2009 season with the Boise Burn of af2, and in the 2010 season with the Arizona Rattlers of the Arena Football League.

References

External links
Arizona Rattlers bio

1984 births
Living people
Players of American football from California
American football defensive tackles
American football offensive linemen
Boise State Broncos football players
Kansas City Chiefs players
Seattle Seahawks players
Minnesota Vikings players
Rhein Fire players
Hamilton Tiger-Cats players
Spokane Shock players
Arizona Rattlers players
People from Brea, California
Sportspeople from Orange County, California
Boise Burn players